The flag of the British Antarctic Territory was granted on 21 April 1998. It features the coat of arms granted on 1 August 1963, a year after the British Antarctic Territory, a British Overseas Territory, was created. Previously, the Territory was a part of the Falkland Islands Dependencies and used the same flag. On 30 May 1969, a blue ensign with the British Antarctic Territory coat of arms in the fly was introduced as a civil ensign.

Description

The flag is a white ensign, without a cross, with the Union Flag in the canton, defaced with the coat of arms of the British Antarctic Territory, introduced in 1952. The coat of arms features a lion, representing the United Kingdom, and a penguin, representing the native wildlife. The crest of the coat of arms is the RRS Discovery, which first took Robert Falcon Scott and Ernest Shackleton to Antarctica as part of the British National Antarctic Expedition in 1901. She is currently a museum ship in Dundee. The motto on the coat of arms is "Research and Discovery". 

The official description is as follows:

Use and related flags

The flag flies over the British research stations in the Territory and at the headquarters of the British Antarctic Survey in Cambridge. Vessels of the British Antarctic Survey use a blue ensign defaced with the shield from the coat of arms, which can be seen below. This ensign was introduced by Royal Warrant on 30 May 1969. The flag of the Commissioner for the British Antarctic Territory, a position currently held by Ben Merrick, is also seen below. 

The flag is the only flag of any British dependency to have ever used the white ensign.

Other images

References

See also
 List of flags of the United Kingdom

British Antarctic Territory
British Antarctic Territory
Antarctic
Flag
Flags introduced in 1963
White Ensigns
Flags displaying animals